Autophagy is a process in cellular biology.

Autophagy may also refer to:

 Autophagia, a mental disorder or a symptom of a mental disorder
 Autophagy  (journal), a scientific journal

See also
 Self-cannibalism, the practice of eating oneself